The following lists events that happened during the year 2000 in Ireland.

Incumbents
 President: Mary McAleese
 Taoiseach: Bertie Ahern (FF)
 Tánaiste: Mary Harney (PD)
 Minister for Finance: Charlie McCreevy (FF)
 Chief Justice:
 Liam Hamilton (until 1 June 2000)
 Ronan Keane (from 1 June 2000)
 Dáil: 28th
 Seanad: 21st

Events

February
 3 February – John Gilligan's extradition from the UK to Ireland on drug trafficking and murder charges was completed.
 11 February – The British government suspended devolution in Northern Ireland.

April
 10 April
 The Dublin Area Rapid Transit system was extended southwards from Bray to Greystones and northwards from Howth Junction to Malahide.
 The ambulance service regulator, the Pre-Hospital Emergency Care Council, was established.

May
 5 May – The People in Need Trust held its seventh event. 
 6 May – The Provisional Irish Republican Army began decommissioning its weapons.
 30 May – Devolution returned to Northern Ireland.

July
 6 July – The Intoxicating Liquor Act, 2000 came into effect abolishing the so-called "holy hour" between 2 pm and 4 pm on Sundays when pubs had been forced to close their doors.

December
 12 December – President Bill Clinton of the United States arrived in Dublin beginning his last international trip as President. He met with President Mary McAleese, Taoiseach Bertie Ahern, and gave a speech in Dundalk.
 13 December – Bill Clinton met with the political leaders of Northern Ireland.
 31 December – Ireland celebrated as the 20th century drew to a close.

Arts and literature
 7 February – The Chester Beatty Library opened in its new premises in the grounds of Dublin Castle. 
 31 October – Boyband Westlife scored their seventh straight UK number one, becoming the only artists in UK chart history to achieve this.
 December – The quarterly cultural magazine The Dublin Review was launched by Brendan Barrington.
 John Banville's novel Eclipse was published.
 Anne Enright's novel What Are You Like? was published.

Sport

Association football
Shelbourne won the double of the League of Ireland Premier Division and the FAI Cup for the first time in their history.
They then knocked out Macedonian side Sloga Jugomagnat in the first round of the UEFA Champions League qualifiers.  Their 1–0 win in Skopje was the first away win in a European tie by a League of Ireland side for eighteen years. Rosenborg of Norway knock Shelbourne out 4–2 on aggregate in the second qualifying round.

Gaelic games
Kilkenny won the All-Ireland Senior Hurling Championship.
Kerry won the All-Ireland Senior Football Championship.

Golf
Murphy's Irish Open was won by Patrik Sjöland (Sweden).

Births
 14 January – Jonathan Afolabi, footballer
 26 January – Heather Payne, footballer
 28 January – Aaron Connolly, footballer 
 1 February – Gavin Kilkenny, footballer 
 25 March – Conor Coventry, English-born footballer 
 4 May – Ciaran Booth, English-born rugby union player 
 6 July – Michael Obafemi, footballer 
 28 July – Lee O'Connor, footballer
 7 August – Jordanne Jones, actress
 7 August – Jaze Kabia, footballer
 16 October – David Rawle, actor
 2 November – Demi Isaac Oviawe, Nigerian-born actress

Deaths

January to June

 15 January – Alf Ringstead, footballer (b. 1927)
 28 January – Tony Doyle, actor (b. 1942)
 1 February – Patrick Shanahan, Fianna Fáil TD (b. 1908)
 2 February – Francis Stuart, writer (b. 1902)
 13 February – F. X. Martin, priest and historian (b. 1922)
 25 February – Tom McEllistrim, Fianna Fáil TD (b. 1926)
 6 March – Jonathan Philbin Bowman, journalist and radio presenter (b. 1969)
 20 April – John Carthy, shot dead by the Garda Síochána (b. 1972)
 7 June – Mona Tyndall, missionary sister and development worker (b. 1921)
 10 June – Frank Patterson, tenor (b. 1938)

July to December
 10 July – Denis O'Conor Don, hereditary chief of the O'Conor Don sept (b. 1912)
 14 August – John Boland, senior Fine Gael politician (b. 1944)
 18 October – James Gill, cricketer (b. 1911)
 8 November – Brian Boydell, composer, professor of music at Trinity College Dublin (b. 1917)
 18 November – Lochlainn O'Raifeartaigh, physicist (b. 1933)
 21 November – Paddy Flanagan, cyclist (b. 1941)
 26 November – Paddy Donegan, former Fine Gael TD and Cabinet Minister (b. 1923)
 15 December – Paddy Barry, Cork hurler (b. 1928)

See also
 2000 in Irish television

References

External links
 2000 at Reeling in the Years